The 1970 EuroHockey Club Champions Cup was the second unofficial edition of Europe's premier field hockey competition. It took place in Terrassa as a group stage, which was won again by hosts and defending champions CD Terrassa.

Standings
  CD Terrassa
  Larensche MHC
  Royal Leopold Club
  SC 1880 Frankfurt
  Cork Church of Ireland
  Lyon
  TJ Prague
  MDA Roma
  Red Sox Zürich

References

See also
European Hockey Federation

EuroHockey Club Champions Cup
International field hockey competitions hosted by Catalonia
EuroHockey Club Champions Cup
EuroHockey Club Champions Cup